Kiyoo (written: 清雄, 清夫 or 潔雄) is a masculine Japanese given name. Notable people with the name include:

, Japanese footballer
, Japanese yōga artist
, Japanese seismologist
, Japanese seismologist
, Japanese hurdler

Japanese masculine given names